MUH or Muh may refer to:

 Marsa Matruh International Airport, Egypt (IATA code) 
 Mathematical universe hypothesis, a "theory of everything" 
 MUH Arla, a major German dairy company
 Robert A. Muh (born 1938), American entrepreneur and philanthropist 
 Mercy University Hospital, Cork, Ireland